Neal H. Moritz (born June 6, 1959) is an American film producer and founder of Original Film. He has produced over 70 major motion pictures which have grossed a total of over $11 billion worldwide as of 2021. He is best known for the Fast & Furious franchise, the Jump Street and Sonic the Hedgehog films, as well as the television series Prison Break and Emmy-nominated The Boys. His early credits include teen classics I Know What You Did Last Summer, Urban Legend and Cruel Intentions.

Life
Neal H. Moritz was born in Los Angeles, California, to Milton Moritz and Barbara (née Levin). His paternal grandfather, Joseph Moritz, owned movie theaters in Pittsburgh and was an early investor in American International Pictures (AIP). Milton Moritz was born in Pittsburgh and moved to California after falling ill with rheumatic fever at age eight, when his doctor suggested the family move to a better climate. He was head of marketing at AIP and was later CEO and president of the National Association of Theatre Owners of California/Nevada. Moritz is from a Jewish family.

Moritz grew up in Westwood and graduated from UCLA, where he participated in a Semester at Sea program. When he came back, he gave away several backpacks that were popular with Chinese students. He had so many requests for the backpacks that he and a friend began a company importing purses and bags from Taiwan. He sold the company to an investor, and returned to school. He earned a master's degree from the Peter Stark Producing Program at the University of Southern California's School of Cinema-Television in 1985. He is a member of the school's Alumni Development Council. As of 2021, Moritz has been married for 20 years and has two children, aged 19 and 16.

Career
Moritz has more than 70 films to his credit, including Juice starring Tupac Shakur, I Know What You Did Last Summer, the first two films of the Urban Legend franchise, Cruel Intentions, The Skulls, the Fast & Furious franchise, Not Another Teen Movie, the first two films of the XXX film series, being XXX and XXX: State of the Union, S.W.A.T., Evan Almighty, I Am Legend, Made of Honor, Sweet Home Alabama, Total Recall and the Jump Street films, being 21 Jump Street and 22 Jump Street.

Recent credits include Sonic the Hedgehog, Spenser Confidential, Bloodshot, Escape Room, Goosebumps and Goosebumps 2: Haunted Halloween.

He has also produced the television series The Boys, S.W.A.T., Preacher, Happy, Prison Break, and The Big Break.

In September 2017, Moritz and Original Film signed a first-look deal for Paramount Pictures that began on January 1, 2019, leaving his longtime home, Sony Pictures, after over 20 years. However, he still maintains his overall deal at Sony Pictures Television.  

In October 2018, Moritz filed a lawsuit against Universal Pictures for breach of oral contract and committing promissory fraud after the distributor removed him as lead producer on Hobbs & Shaw. His lawsuit was settled in September 2020 and he received producer credit for the 2021 film F9.

Filmography
He was a producer in all films unless otherwise noted.

Film

Sony Pictures

NBCUniversal

Lionsgate

The Walt Disney Studios
{|class="wikitable"
! Year
! Title
! Director
! Notes
|-
| 1997
| Volcano
| Mick Jackson
| Under 20th Century Studios
|-
| 2002
| Sweet Home Alabama
| Andy Tennant
| Under Touchstone Pictures
|-
| 2019
| The Art of Racing in the Rain
| Simon Curtis
| Under 20th Century Fox
|-
| 2022
| The Princess
| Le-Van Kiet
| Under 20th Century Studios and Hulu
|}

Warner Bros. Discovery

Paramount Global

Other studios

Direct-to-video
 Cruel Intentions 2  (2000)
 The Skulls II (2002) (Executive producer)
 The Skulls III (2004)
 Cruel Intentions 3 (2004)
 Devour (2005)
 I'll Always Know What You Did Last Summer (2006)
 Species: The Awakening (2007)
 S.W.A.T.: Firefight (2011)
 S.W.A.T.: Under Siege (2017)

As an actor

Thanks
 My Trip to the Dark Side (2011)

TelevisionAll works, he was executive producer unless otherwise noted. Shasta McNasty (1999)
 Still Life (2003)
 Greg the Bunny (2002–04)
 Tru Calling (2003–05)
 Point Pleasant (2005–06)
 The Big C (2010–13)
 Save Me (2013)
 Prison Break (2005–17)
 Happy! (2017–19)
 The Boys (2019–present)
 Fast & Furious Spy Racers (2019–2021)
 Preacher (2016–19)
 S.W.A.T. (2017–present)
 I Know What You Did Last Summer (2021)
 The Boys Presents: Diabolical (2022)

TV Movies
 Framed (1990)
 Blind Justice (1994)
 The Rat Pack (1998)
 Monster! (1999)
 Cabin by the Lake (2000)
 Hendrix (2000)
 Electra's Guy (2000)
 Class Warfare (2001)
 Return to Cabin by the Lake (2001)
 Shotgun Love Dolls (2001)
 The Pool at Maddy Breaker's (2003)
 Vegas Dick (2003)
 Not Another High School Show (2007)
 SIS (2008)
 Prison Break: The Final Break (2009)

TV Pilots
 Mr. Ed (2004)
 Untitled Dave Caplan pilot (2008)
 Cruel Intentions (2016)
 Roadside Picnic'' (2017)

References

External links

 

1959 births
Living people
20th-century American Jews
American film producers
Businesspeople from Los Angeles
Film producers from California
USC School of Cinematic Arts alumni
21st-century American Jews